DXSN (927 AM) Radyo Agusan is a radio station owned and operated by Agusan Del Sur Broadcasting Service, the media arm of the Government of Agusan del Sur. Its studio is located in DOP Government Center, Brgy. Patin-ay, Prosperidad. It is the only AM station in the province.

References

Radio stations in Agusan del Sur
Radio stations established in 1996
News and talk radio stations in the Philippines